The All-China Federation of Railway Workers’ Unions is a national industrial union of the All-China Federation of Trade Unions in the People's Republic of China.

External links
basic info from the ACFTU

National industrial unions (China)
Railway labor unions
Transport trade unions in China